Blue Bird or Bluebird is the name of various cars and boats used by Sir Malcolm Campbell, his son Donald and other family members to set land and water speed records.

Origins of the name 
The name Blue Bird was originally inspired by the play of that name by Maurice Maeterlinck, and the vehicles were painted a shade of azure blue.

Malcolm Campbell had a succession of Darracq racing cars in the 1920s, which in the fashion of the day he had named  'Flapper I' ,   'Flapper II'  and   'Flapper III' . It was  'Flapper III'  which he renamed after seeing the play, famously and impetuously knocking up a paint shop owner at night, so as to purchase blue paint before racing at Brooklands the following day.

In 1925, he also raced an Itala at Brooklands with the name  'The Blue Bird'  painted on the bonnet.

Bluebird or Blue Bird?
Malcolm Campbell named them "Blue Bird", Donald "Bluebird".

The hydroplane K4 began life as Malcolm's "Blue Bird", but when Donald decided to use her in 1949, after his father's death, he renamed her "Bluebird".

Cars

Sir Malcolm Campbell 
 Sunbeam 350HP: 1923 (renamed after Campbell's purchase)
 Chrysler Six Model B-70 1925
 Napier-Campbell Blue Bird: 1927–1928
 Campbell-Napier-Railton Blue Bird: 1931–1932
 Campbell-Railton Blue Bird: 1933–1935

Donald Campbell 
 Bluebird-Proteus CN7
 Bluebird CMN-8 never built

Donald Wales 

Donald Wales, grandson of Malcolm Campbell and nephew of Donald Campbell, has contested the world electric powered land speed record. He was also the test driver for the British Steam Car Inspiration, which broke the steam-powered land speed record. He was also the driver for Project Runningblade, setting the world land speed record for a lawnmower. 
 Bluebird Electric 2

Boats

Sir Malcolm Campbell 
 Blue Bird K3
 Blue Bird K4

Donald Campbell 

 Bluebird K4: renamed in 1949, destroyed in 1951
 Bluebird K7: 1955–1967

Gina Campbell 
Gina Campbell, daughter of Donald Campbell, has contested the women's world water speed record.
 Agfa Bluebird

See also 
 Bluebird of Chelsea
 Bluebird Garage
 List of vehicle speed records

References

External links 
 Bluebird Electric
 Bluebird Project
 "Race For Higher Speed On Land and in Air" Popular Mechanics, March 1933

Bluebird record-breaking vehicles
Land speed record cars
Water speed records
Bluebird
Bluebird